George Duckworth was a cricketer.

George Duckworth may also refer to:

George Arthur Duckworth (1901–1986), British Conservative politician
George Herbert Duckworth (1868–1934), English public servant
Sir George Henry James Duckworth-King, 6th Baronet (1891–1952), of the Duckworth-King baronets